Grzegorz Rossoliński-Liebe (born 1979 in Zabrze, Poland as Grzegorz Rossoliński) is a German–Polish historian based in Berlin, associated with the Friedrich Meinecke Institute of the Free University of Berlin. He specializes in the history of the Holocaust and East-Central Europe, fascism, nationalism, the history of antisemitism, the history of the Soviet Union, and the politics of memory.

Career
Rossoliński-Liebe studied cultural history and East European history at the Viadrina European University in Frankfurt (Oder) from 1999 to 2005. He worked on his doctoral dissertation about Stepan Bandera and the Organization of Ukrainian Nationalists at the University of Alberta and the University of Hamburg from 2007, and defended his PhD at the University of Hamburg in June 2012. Between 2012 and 2014, he worked on a post-doctoral project at the Free University of Berlin on the Ukrainian diasporic memory of the Holocaust. He also worked as a research assistant at the Foundation Memorial to the Murdered Jews of Europe and at the Vienna Wiesenthal Institute for Holocaust Studies. He is the author of Stepan Bandera: The Life and Afterlife of a Ukrainian Nationalist. Fascism, Genocide, and Cult, a scholarly biography of Ukrainian nationalist leader Stepan Bandera, and an in-depth study of his political cult. From 2014 to 2018, Rossoliński-Liebe investigated the German-Polish collaboration in World War II. During this time, he was a Saul Kagan Fellow of the Claims Conference and a fellow of the United States Holocaust Memorial Museum, the Harry Frank Guggenheim Foundation, the Fondation pour la Mémoire de la Shoah, the German Historical Institute Warsaw and the Yad Vashem International Institute for Holocaust Research.

Political reactions
Rossoliński-Liebe was invited in late February and early March 2012 by the Heinrich Böll Foundation, the German Academic Exchange Service, and the German embassy in Kyiv, to deliver six lectures about Bandera in three Ukrainian cities. The lectures were scheduled to take place in February and March 2012 in Lviv, Dnipro and Kyiv. The organizers, however, were unable to find a suitable venue in Lviv, and also, three of the four lectures in Dnipro and Kyiv were canceled a few hours prior to the event. The only lecture took place in the German embassy in Kyiv, under the protection of police. In front of the building, approximately one hundred protesters, including members of the radical-right Svoboda party, tried to convince a few hundred interested students, scholars, and ordinary Ukrainians not to attend the presentation, claiming that Rossoliński-Liebe was "Joseph Goebbels' grandchild" and a "liberal fascist from Berlin." In response to the harassment of his lectures and the threats made towards him during his lecture trip in Ukraine, the petition "For Freedom of Speech and Expression in Ukraine" was signed by 97 persons, including scholars such as Etienne François, Alexandr Kruglov, Gertrud Pickhan, Susanne Heim, Alexander Wöll, Dovid Katz, Delphine Bechtel, Per Anders Rudling, and Mark von Hagen.

Publications 
 Der polnisch-ukrainische Konflikt im Historikerdiskurs: Perspektiven, Interpretationen und Aufarbeitung. Wien: New Academic Press,  2017, .
 With Arnd Bauerkämper: Fascism without Borders. Transnational Connections and Cooperation between Movements and Regimes in Europe 1918 to 1945. Oxford: Berghahn 2017, .
 With Regina Fritz und Jana Starek: Alma mater antisemitica. Akademisches Milieu, Juden und Antisemitismus an den Universitäten Europas zwischen 1918 und 1939. Wien: New Academic Press, 2016, .
 “Ukraińska policja, nacjonalizm i zagłada Żydów w Galicji Wschodniej i na Wołyniu,” Zagłada Żydów. Studia i Materiały 13 (2017): 57-79.
 “Holocaust Amnesia. The Ukrainian Diaspora and the Genocide of the Jews,” German Yearbook of Contemporary History 1 (2016): 107-144.
 “Remembering and Forgetting the Past: Jewish and Ukrainian Memories of the Holocaust in western Ukraine,” Yad Vashem Studies vol. 43, no. 2 (2015): 13-50.
The Fascist Kernel of Ukrainian Genocidal Nationalism, The Carl Beck Papers in Russian and East European Studies, Number 2402. Pittsburgh: The Center for Russian and East European Studies, 2015.
 Stepan Bandera: The Life and Afterlife of a Ukrainian Nationalist. Fascism, Genocide, and Cult. Stuttgart: Ibidem Press 2014, . (Reviewed by Delphine Bechtel)
 “Erinnerungslücke Holocaust. Die ukrainische Diaspora und der Genozid an den Juden,” Vierteljahrshefte für Zeitgeschichte vol. 62, no. 2 (2014): 397–430.
 “Der Verlauf und die Täter des Lemberger Pogroms vom Sommer 1941. Zum aktuellen Stand der Forschung,“ Jahrbuch für Antisemitismusforschung 22 (2013): 207–243.
 “Debating, Obfuscating and Disciplining the Holocaust: Post-Soviet Historical Discourses on the OUN-UPA and other Nationalist Movements,” East European Jewish Affairs vol. 42, no. 3 (2012): 199–241.
 “The ‘Ukrainian National Revolution’ of 1941. Discourse and Practice of a Fascist Movement,” Kritika: Explorations in Russian and Eurasian History vol. 12, no. 1 (2011): 83–114.
 “Celebrating Fascism and War Criminality in Edmonton. The Political Myth and Cult of Stepan Bandera in Multicultural Canada,” Kakanien Revisited 12 (2010): 1–16.
 “Der polnisch-ukrainische Historikerdiskurs über den polnisch-ukrainischen Konflikt 1943–1947,“ Jahrbücher für Geschichte Osteuropas 57 (2009): 54–85.
 “Die Stadt Lemberg in den Schichten ihrer politischen Denkmäler,“ ece-urban (The Online Publications Series of the Center for Urban History of East Central Europe), No. 6, Lviv, October 2009 (Ukrainian translation).
 “Umbenennungen in der Ziemia Lubuska nach 1945,“ in Terra Transoderana: zwischen Neumark und Ziemia Lubuska, ed. Bernd Vogenbeck (Berlin: Bebra 2008): 59–68.
 “Der Raum der Stadt Lemberg in den Schichten seiner politischen Denkmäler,“ Kakanien Revisited 12 (2009): 1–21.
 “Bandera und Nikifor – zwei Modernen in einer Stadt. Die ‘nationalbürgerliche‘ und die ‘weltbürgerliche‘ Moderne in Lemberg,“ in Eine neue Gesellschaft in einer alten Stadt, ed. Lutz Henke, Grzegorz Rossoliński, and Philipp Ther (Wrocław: ATUT, 2007): 109–124.

References

External links 
 Rossoliński-Liebe at the Friedrich-Meinecke-Institut of the Freie Universität Berlin
 Rossoliński-Liebe on Academia.edu
 Rossoliński-Liebe on Clio-Online
 Rossoliński-Liebe on Google Scholar

Living people
1979 births
21st-century German historians
21st-century Polish historians
Polish male non-fiction writers
German male non-fiction writers
Historians of the Holocaust
Historians of Eastern Europe
European University Viadrina alumni
University of Hamburg alumni
Academic staff of the Free University of Berlin